The Jacob Manning House is a historic house in Reading, Massachusetts.  Built in 1877 for garden nursery owner Jacob Manning, this -story wood-frame house is an excellent local example of Stick style architecture.  It has a steeply pitched roof, multiple gables, tall thin windows, and decorative half-timber woodwork.  The owner, Jacob Manning, owned one of the largest nurseries in the area, and was responsible for the landscaping of the Massachusetts pavilion at the 1893 Chicago World Fair.

The house was listed on the National Register of Historic Places in 1984.

See also
National Register of Historic Places listings in Reading, Massachusetts
National Register of Historic Places listings in Middlesex County, Massachusetts

References

Houses on the National Register of Historic Places in Reading, Massachusetts
Houses in Reading, Massachusetts
1877 establishments in Massachusetts
Houses completed in 1877